Robert Pierre Sarrabére (August 30, 1926 – January 11, 2017) was a Catholic bishop.

Ordained to the priesthood in 1950, Serrabére served as bishop of the Diocese of Aire et Dax, France, from 1978 to 2002. He had served as coadjutor of the diocese from 1975 to 1978.

Notes

1926 births
2017 deaths
20th-century Roman Catholic bishops in France